Togliatti may refer to:
Eugenio Giuseppe Togliatti (1890–1977), Italian mathematician
Togliatti surface, an algebraic surface discovered by him
Palmiro Togliatti (1893–1964), leader of the Italian Communist Party
The Togliatti amnesty, drafted by Palmiro Togliatti in 1946
Tolyatti, a city in Russia named after Palmiro Togliatti
FC Lada Togliatti, a Russian football club
FC Togliatti, a Russian football club
FC Akademiya Tolyatti, a Russian football club
HC Lada Togliatti, a Russian professional ice hockey team
TogliattiAzot, a Russian chemical company